Hermes Press is an American comic book publisher. They are known, in part, for their reprints of The Phantom, as well as other historical titles such as Buck Rogers, Brenda Starr, and Dark Shadows. Hermes Press also publishes original content such as Scratch9.

Titles

A

B

C

D

E

F

G

H

I

J

L

M

N

P

R

S

T

U

V

W

Z

Notes

Lists of comics by publisher